Megalomus tortricoides is a species of brown lacewing in the family Hemerobiidae. It was first described by Rambur in 1842.

Distribution
This species is widespread in central and southern Europe. It is not present in the United Kingdom.

Habitat
These lacewings almost exclusively inhabit broad-leaved trees, especially Crataegus, Prunus and Berberis, but they can also be found in xerothermic forest edges with pines. They are present from sea level to mountain level.

Description

In Megalomus tortricoides the head and the body are glossy, black or brown black. Antennae are mostly dark brown. The membrane of the forewings is distinctly spotted, a recurrent vein is present and the radial sector shows at least five ribs. Forewings have two fully formed rows of transverse rows.

This species is very similar to Megalomus hirtus, which is slightly smaller and shows a maculation of the front and back wings darker and more contrasted. The females can be separated only on the basis of tiny differences. In general these two species can only be distinguished on the basis of the shape of the 10th tergite of the males. In fact the  tip of  the abdomen of  males have a dorsal hump on the ectoproct.

Biology
Adults are in flight between April to October (these insects partly overwinter). Like their relatives, they are predominantly twilight and nocturnal. Adults mainly feed on aphids, tree sap and honeydew, where as larvae are active predators on aphids and bark lice.

Bibliography
Aspöck H., Aspöck U. & Hölzel H. (1980) - Die Neuropteres Europas – Goecke & Evers, Krefeld
Oswald J.D. (2018). LDL Neuropterida Species of the World (version Jul 2018). In: Roskov Y., Ower G., Orrell T., Nicolson D., Bailly N., Kirk P.M., Bourgoin T., DeWalt R.E., Decock W., De Wever A., Nieukerken E. van, Zarucchi J., Penev L., eds. (2018).

References

External links
 Entomologi Italiani 

Hemerobiiformia
Insects described in 1842